The Salandra I government of Italy held office from 21 March 1914 until 5 November 1914, a total of 229 days, or 7 months and 15 days.

Government parties
The government was composed by the following parties:

Composition

References

Italian governments
1914 establishments in Italy
1914 disestablishments in Italy